Indo-Pacific Economic Framework for Prosperity (IPEF) is an economic initiative launched by United States President Joe Biden on May 23, 2022. The framework launched with a total of fourteen participating founding member nations, with the late entry of Fiji, the first South Pacific Island to join, with an open invitation for other countries to join at any time.

Biden described the initiative as "writing the new rules for the 21st century economy", stating that the agreement would make the participant's economies "grow faster and fairer". Commerce Secretary Gina Raimondo argued that the framework constituted "the most significant international economic engagement that the United States has ever had in this region". Analysts have compared it to the Trans-Pacific Partnership which the United States withdrew from in 2017.

The initiative is intended to be a precursor for later negotiations, as it does not include a uniform lowering of tariffs.

The four themes of the proposed IPEF are:
 
 Fair and resilient trade
 Supply chain resilience
 Infrastructure, clean energy, and decarbonization
 Tax and anti-corruption

Participating nations
IPEF has fourteen member states and represents 40% of world GDP.

 (partly opted out on the trade pillar)

Reactions 
Chinese Foreign Minister Wang Yi criticized the initiative as an attempt to further economic decoupling from China. Wang Yi argued that the initiative, and the US Indo-Pacific strategy as a whole, created divisions and "incited confrontation". Wang stated that such an agreement would "ultimately be a failure".

Many analysts have criticized the lack of inclusion of Taiwan in the framework, with Taiwan News calling the lack of inclusion a "snub". An opinion piece published in The Hill asserted that Taiwan was excluded in order to appease key "fence-sitter" countries such as Indonesia whose governments feared angering China.

Former Malaysian Prime Minister Mahathir Mohamad criticized the grouping as an initiative intended to isolate China, saying "many countries recognize that this is not an economic grouping but it is truly a political grouping."

Indian Position 
The Indo-Pacific Economic Framework is relied on four pillars namely tax, anti-corruption, clean energy and data and privacy. So far, India has agreed to three pillars relating to supply chains: tax, anti-corruption and clean energy, but the fourth pillar on data and privacy is yet to be completely agreed upon. Prabir De of the Research and Information System for Developing Countries, a think tank of the MEA, wrote that India may be uncomfortable with the US high standards, and would like to avoid risks. He further added, “Some areas proposed in the IPEF do not appear to serve India’s interests. For example, the IPEF talks about digital governance but the IPEF formulation contains issues that directly conflict with India’s stated position.”, Minister of Commerce & Industry Piyush Goyal also said at the press conference that India was in the process of firming up its own digital framework and laws, particularly regarding privacy and data, and it would wait for more information. In the meantime, officials will be participating in the discussions “with an open mind”.

Comparison with RCEP 
The Indo-Pacific Economic Framework would "outweigh" in both population and gross domestic product the Regional Comprehensive Economic Partnership. The only RCEP members not also included in the IPEF are China, Myanmar, Cambodia, and Laos; while non-RCEP members are the United States, India, and Fiji.

See also 
 Indo-Pacific
 Free and Open Indo-Pacific (FOIP)

References 

International economic organizations
2022 establishments in the United States
Organizations established in 2022